The Trofeo Spagnolo was a summer association football friendly tournament that take place in Genoa, Italy, from 1995 to 2012. The tournament was organized by Genoa C.F.C. in memoriam of Vincenzo Claudio Spagnolo, a Genoa fan that was murdered near where Genoa's match against Milan was being played, on 29 January 1995. The tournament was suspended in 2005 due to the unavailability Genoa's Stadio Luigi Ferraris and in 2011 because of the stadium being needed for a second round Coppa Italia match between Sampdoria and Alessandria.

The teams played three round-robin matches that were each one half of 45 minutes. If any match ended in a draw, it was decided by a penalty shoot-out. Starting in 1998, the title was awarded to the winner of a single match at the Stadio Luigi Ferraris.

Winners

Editions
Note: From 1995 to 1997, the standings were determined by a round-robin table.

References

External links
 Trofeo Spagnolo at Rec.Sport.Soccer Statistics Foundation.

Italian football friendly trophies
Genoa C.F.C.
Football in Genoa